Deh Chaneh (also Romanized as Deh Chāneh; also known as Deh-i-Chunāi) is a village in Kamazan-e Vosta Rural District, Zand District, Malayer County, Hamadan Province, Iran. At the 2006 census, its population was 424, in 95 families.

References 

Populated places in Malayer County